The Cinema Stakes is an American Thoroughbred horse race for three-year-old horses held annually at Santa Anita Park Arcadia, California. Raced on turf over a distance of one and one-eighth miles (9 furlongs) in late May or early June.

History
The event was inaugurated in 1946 at Hollywood Park Racetrack.

The race was run in two divisions in 1961 and 1963. It was not run in 1974.

In 1973 the event was given Grade II status. It held this classification until 1994 when it was downgraded to Grade III.

The event was not held from 2010 to 2018.

In 2016 the event was renewed as the Rainbow Stakes at Santa Anita Park and renamed back to the Cinema Stakes in 2019.

Winners since 1985

 † In 1989, Notorious Pleasure finished first but was disqualified and set back to third.

Earlier winners

 1984 - Prince True
 1983 - Baron O'Dublin
 1982 - Give Me Strength
 1981 - Minnesota Chief
 1980 - First Albert
 1979 - Beau's Eagle
 1978 - Kamehameha
 1977 - Bad 'N Big
 1976 - Majestic Light
 1975 - Terete
 1974 - no race
 1973 - Amen
 1972 - Finalista
 1971 - Niagara
 1970 - Dartagnan
 1969 - Noholme Jr.
 1968 - Pinjara
 1967 - Dr. Roy E.
 1966 - Drin
 1965 - Arksroni
 1964 - Close By
 1963 - Y Flash
 1962 - Black Sheep
 1961 - Bushel-N-Peck
 1960 - New Policy
 1959 - Silver Spoon
 1958 - The Shoe
 1957 - Round Table
 1956 - Social Climber
 1955 - Guilton Madero
 1954 - Miz Clementine
 1953 - Ali's Gem
 1952 - A Gleam
 1951 - Mucho Hosso
 1950 - Great Circle
 1949 - Pedigree
 1948 - Drumbeat
 1947 - Yankee Valor
 1946 - Honeymoon

References
 The Cinema Handicap at Pedigree Query
 The 2008 Cinema Handicap at the NTRA
 The 2009 Cinema Handicap at the NTRA

Horse races in California
Santa Anita Park
Turf races in the United States
Flat horse races for three-year-olds
Recurring sporting events established in 1946
1946 establishments in California